Isse Ahmed Ismail (born 8 March 1999) is a footballer who plays as a midfielder for Haninge. Born in Sweden, he represents the Somalia national team.

Club career 
In 2017, Ismail began his career at IFK Osby, before signing for Superettan club IFK Värnamo in 2018.

International career 
On 15 June 2021, Ismail made his debut for Somalia, in a 1–0 friendly loss against Djibouti.

References 

1999 births
Living people
People from Växjö
People with acquired Somali citizenship
Somalian footballers
Somalia international footballers
Swedish footballers
Swedish people of Somali descent
Association football midfielders
IFK Värnamo players
Superettan players
Ettan Fotboll players
Division 2 (Swedish football) players
Sportspeople from Kronoberg County